Nizhniye Sergi is a town and the administrative center of Nizhneserginsky District in Sverdlovsk Oblast, Russia, located on a rolling plain surrounded by the Ural Mountains, on the Serga River  from Yekaterinburg, the administrative center of the oblast. Population:

History
It was founded in 1743.

Administrative and municipal status
Within the framework of the administrative divisions, Nizhniye Sergi serves as the administrative center of Nizhneserginsky District. As an administrative division, it is, together with eleven rural localities, incorporated within Nizhneserginsky District as the Town of Nizhniye Sergi. As a municipal division, the Town of Nizhniye Sergi is incorporated within Nizhneserginsky Municipal District as Nizhneserginskoye Urban Settlement.

Economy
The town is an industrial center. The basis of its economy is mainly a plant that produces nails, wires, and other products of ferrous metallurgy. Most of the production output is exported.

Tourism
Nizhniye Sergi, with its Lake Montayevo health resort, is a popular destination in the Ural region. The health resort is known for its mineral water that includes thirty-seven chemical elements.

References

Notes

Sources

Cities and towns in Sverdlovsk Oblast
Krasnoufimsky Uyezd
Populated places established in 1743
1743 establishments in the Russian Empire